Yusefabad-e Shah Mirza Kandi (also Romanized as Yūsefābād-e Shāh Mīrzā Kandī; also known as Shāh Mīrzākandī and Yūsefābād) is a village in Bash Qaleh Rural District, in the Central District of Urmia County, West Azerbaijan Province, Iran. At the 2006 census, its population was 58, in 17 families.

References 

Populated places in Urmia County